Honey, Wheat and Laughter is the third studio album by Canadian singer Anne Murray issued in 1970 on Capitol Records. 

Honey, Wheat and Laughter contained work by, among others, James Taylor and Gene MacLellan. The album was released only in Canada; however, after Murray's single "Snowbird" gained traction in the United States, several of its tracks were re-released on the 1970 compilation Snowbird.

MacLellan's "Put Your Hand in the Hand" would become a top-ten hit for the band Ocean in 1971.

Reception
The album won the 1971 Juno Award for Best Produced MOR Album.

Track listing

Personnel
Anne Murray - vocals
Amos Garrett, Brian Ahern - guitar
Buddy Cage - steel guitar
Skip Beckwith - bass
Bill Speer, Brian Browne - keyboards
John Mills-Cockell - synthesizer
Bruce Philp, Ron Rully, Tammy Graham - percussion
Brent Titcomb - harmonica
Steven Rhymer - recorder

References

1970 albums
Anne Murray albums
Albums produced by Brian Ahern (producer)
Capitol Records albums
Juno Award-winning albums